Ek Hi Raasta (Hindi: एक ही रास्ता, Only One Way) is a 1993 Bollywood about a terrorist with aspirations to rule India. Directed by Deepak Bahry, the film is a remake of the Ek Hi Raasta (1977) which starred Rekha. Films under the title were also released first in 1939 and then in 1956. The film stars Ajay Devgn, Raveena Tandon, Raza Murad and Saeed Jaffrey.

Plot 
A terrorist named Kubla wants to rule India. So, he works with army officer Vikram to steal army information for him. However, there are other including army trainee Karan who want to prevent this which causes problems between them.

Cast 

 Ajay Devgn as Karan Singh
 Raveena Tandon as Priya Choudhry
 Raza Murad as Kubla
 Saeed Jaffrey as Colonel Choudhry
 Deven Verma as Mehra
 Kulbhushan Kharbanda as Bhagat Singh
 Mohnish Bahl as Vikram Singh
 Sharat Saxena as Army officer
 Arun Bakshi as Major Rathore

Soundtrack

External links 
 

1993 films
1990s Hindi-language films
1993 action films
Films about terrorism in India
Indian action films
Remakes of Indian films
Hindi-language action films
Films directed by Deepak Bahry